Mario Ignacio Francisco Tomás Antonio de Veintemilla y Villacís (31 July 1828 – 19 July 1908) was President of Ecuador 8 September 1876 to 10 January 1883. During his presidency, his niece Marieta de Veintemilla acted as his first lady.

References

 IGNACIO DE VEINTEMILLA VILLACIS . diccionariobiograficoecuador.com

1828 births
1908 deaths
People from Quito
Presidents of Ecuador